Meymanatabad may refer to:
 Meymanatabad, Kurdistan
 Meymanatabad, Tehran